Liceo Francisco Antonio Encina Armanet is a Chilean high school located in Las Cabras, Cachapoal Province, Chile.

The school is named after a Chilean politician, agricultural businessman, political essayist and historian Francisco Antonio Encina.

References 

Educational institutions with year of establishment missing
Secondary schools in Chile
Schools in Cachapoal Province